The TVS Television Network, or TVS for short, was a syndicator of American sports programming. It was one of several "occasional" national television networks that sprang up in the early-to-mid-1960s to take advantage of the establishment of independent (mostly UHF) television stations and relaxation of the AT&T Long Lines usage rates.

History
Eddie Einhorn had begun broadcasting radio coverage of college basketball and built a network of radio stations that covered the NCAA Division I men's basketball tournament games. He later moved into television coverage of college basketball games.

College basketball
Founded by Einhorn, the network originally telecast college basketball games to regional networks at a time when the sport was of no interest to the national networks. Taking advantage of intense regional collegiate rivalries, the network blossomed in the 1960s and developed into a full service sports network. Einhorn proceeded to put together a Saturday afternoon TVS "game of the week" concept that often featured some of the major midwestern independent teams such as Marquette, DePaul, and Notre Dame. These games were widely syndicated at least in the east and midwest.  
 
On January 20, 1968, TVS put together the "Game of the Century" (see below) between the UCLA Bruins and Houston Cougars basketball teams at the Houston Astrodome. This was the game that made college basketball a television broadcast commodity. Six years later (January 26, 1974), TVS televised another historic basketball game as the Bruins fell to Notre Dame, 71-70, breaking the Bruins' 88-game winning streak. TVS proceeded to syndicate a few games nationally each year, often involving UCLA in the middle of their run of 10 national championships in a 12-year span. TVS often used late night time slots for its nationally syndicated games which were played on the west coast.

In addition to these individual games, TVS was a pioneer in bringing college basketball to a national scope-first by their own efforts in the early 1970s, primarily with Dick Enberg and Rod Hundley (sometimes Enberg and Hundley would call a Pac-8 game on a Friday night, fly to the midwest for the TVS game of the week on Saturday afternoon, and then head back to the west coast to call a Pac-8 game on Saturday night), then in 1976, teaming with NBC Sports in a cooperative effort to regionalize NBC's coverage (NBC/local talent, TVS production crews). This partnership lasted through 1983, though it was hampered in later years by NBC losing the rights to the NCAA Division I Men's College Basketball Tournament to CBS Sports in 1982. After the NBC partnership ended and college sports telecasts underwent a court-ordered decentralization in 1984, TVS went back to regionalizing games on their own—a forerunner to the regionalization often seen today.

Besides Dick Enberg and Rod Hundley (who worked with Merle Harmon on the January 7, 1973, contest between Kansas and Notre Dame), other broadcast teams for TVS' college basketball coverage included John Ferguson and Joe Dean (who called the February 21, 1970 contest between Kentucky and LSU), Monte Moore and Ed Macauley (who called the January 2, 1971 contest between Dayton and UCLA), Charlie Jones and Elgin Baylor (who called the January 26, 1972 contest between Providence and USC), Ray Scott and Bill O'Donnell (who called the January 14, 1973 contest between SW Louisiana and Oral Roberts), Al Michaels and Tom Hawkins (who called the January 26, 1974, contest between Notre Dame and UCLA), Max Falkenstein and Paul Deweese (Big Eight Conference) and Jay Randolph and Billy Packer (who called the November 17, 1979 contest between Duke and  Kentucky, November 22, 1980 contest between DePaul and Louisville) and November 21, 1981 contest between BYU and Virginia).

"Game of the Century"

The game that really brought televised college basketball to where it is today was a prime time Saturday night broadcast on January 20, 1968 between two powerhouse teams that had met in the 1967 NCAA Men's Division I Basketball Tournament. The number two and undefeated Houston Cougars hosted the number one and undefeated UCLA Bruins at the Houston Astrodome. The Bruins were the defending national champions and were on a 47-game winning streak. Eddie Einhorn paid $27,000 for the broadcast rights on TVS. In the end, Einhorn signed up 120 stations, many of which would infuriate the networks they were affiliated with by canceling their regular programming to show the game. The Bruins lost to the University of Houston Cougars 71–69 at the Astrodome in front of a record crowd (at the time) of 52,693. This game was dubbed the "Game of the Century". Previously, only NCAA post-season games were broadcast on national television, but only on evidence that broadcasters were going to make a profit from the broadcasts. The "Game of the Century" between the Houston Cougars and the UCLA Bruins proved that Americans were willing to watch college basketball games during the regular seasons.

Other sports on TVS
While college basketball remained the TVS Television Network's signature series, they also expanded into tennis, college football bowl games, NASL pro soccer, tennis, and golf.

In 1974, the network became the official telecaster of the World Football League. (TVS dropped its coverage of the WFL prior to 1975, contributing to the league's already imminent demise; the league had no national television contract for their shortened second season.) TVS also aired World Championship Tennis.

Entertainment programming
In the 1970s, TVS began producing entertainment programming, including Sinatra: The Main Event for ABC in 1974. For many years, TVS produced sports and entertainment programming from Las Vegas including the Alan King Tennis Classic at Caesars Palace; Arm Wrestling at the Imperial Palace, Fun Moments in Sports at Bally's; Bowling from Sam's Town and the Showboat; The Ladies Pro Bowlers Tour (LPBT), and One Club Golf from the Desert Inn.

Transition
By 1980, Eddie Einhorn had sold his interest in the network and became the head of CBS Sports, and later became an owner of the Chicago White Sox with Jerry Reinsdorf; he would also spend time as owner of the USFL's Chicago Blitz. The network stalled in the 1990s, with the trademark status for the network's branding expiring in 1993, and it passed through several owners before finding a permanent home  in the late 1990s with Combined Artists Studios, owned by Tom Ficara, who licensed the network's back catalog to Nostalgia Channel.

By 2000, the network ceased to function.

See also
 1968 in television
 Game of the Century (college basketball)

References

 

   
   

 
Defunct television networks in the United States
College sports television syndicators
Sports television networks in the United States
Television channels and stations established in 1965
NBC Sports
1965 establishments in the United States